Ion Al-Ioani (born 7 May 1983), is a Romanian futsal player who plays for Győri ETO Futsal Club and the Romanian national futsal team.

References

External links
UEFA profile

1983 births
Living people
Romanian men's futsal players